Sylvester McGrew is a former defensive end in the National Football League.

Biography
McGrew was born Sylvester Lee McGrew on February 27, 1960 in New Orleans, Louisiana.

Career
McGrew played with the Green Bay Packers during the 1987 NFL season. He played at the collegiate level at Tulane University.

See also
List of Green Bay Packers players

References

1960 births
Living people
Players of American football from New Orleans
Green Bay Packers players
American football defensive ends
Tulane University alumni
Tulane Green Wave football players